Three Forms (BH 72) is an abstract sculpture by Barbara Hepworth, completed in 1935.

The sculpture was one of the first works completed by Hepworth after the birth of her triplets with Ben Nicholson in October 1934.  It marks a point of departure in her style: her earlier abstract works are based on the human form, but Three Forms is more purely abstract, reduced to simple geometric shapes with little colour.  Her subsequent work continued in a more formal, abstract and non-representational vein.  Hepworth wrote in 1952 that she became "absorbed in the relationships in space, in size and texture and weight, as well as the tensions between forms".

The work consists of three rounded elements positioned on a flat rectangular base, all in polished Seravezza marble (largely white, but small brown marks, grey flecks, and pale grey graining are visible on close inspection). Each element has a precise shape and size, and they are arranged in a similarly precise triangular relationship. The original base has been replaced, but the spatial arrangement of each element remains the same, with a spherical element placed at a distance from two larger and elongated oval forms, the smaller of which lies flat and the larger of which rests on its long edge, both aligned with the longer edge of the rectangular base. The  diameter of the sphere reflects one of the dimensions of both larger elements, each of which also shares a dimension of  (1.5 times as large). Each object was shaped by hand and so is slightly imperfect. The choice of three forms - two alike and one different - may be connected with the birth of Hepworth's triplets - two girls and one boy.

The abstract sculpture in a pure white recalls the contemporary architecture of Le Corbusier, and may also have been inspired by Hepworth's visits to the studios of Brancusi and Arp on a visit to France with Nicholson in 1932.  Hepworth later accepted criticism from physicist John Desmond Bernal that the elements are all positively curved, and suggested that the work could have been improved by the sphere being replaced by a cylinder.

The whole work measures  and weighs .  It was exhibited at the "7&5" exhibition in 1935 and the "Abstract and Concrete Art" exhibition in 1936.  It was bought from Hepworth by Mr and Mrs JR Marcus Brumwell in late 1935, and they donated it to the Tate Gallery in 1964.  It is now displayed at Tate Britain.

References
 barbarahepworth.org.uk
 Work of the week: Three Forms by Barbara Hepworth, Tate Gallery
 Three Forms, Tate Gallery
 catalogue entry
 illustrated companion
 Three Forms (Carving in Grey Alabaster), Tate Gallery (a similar work from 1935, in grey alabaster)
 Three Forms (Carving in Grey Alabaster), catalogue entry, Tate Gallery
 How to Write Art History, Anne d'Alleva, p. 38
 Art In The Making: Aesthetics, Historicity And Practice, Kerstin Mey, p. 190-3

Sculptures by Barbara Hepworth
Sculptures of the Tate galleries
1935 sculptures
Modernist sculpture